By Surprise is an American indie rock band from Haddon Heights, New Jersey.

History
By Surprise began in 2007 releasing an EP titled 478 via Kat Kat Records. In 2009, By Surprise released a 7" split with Hightide Hotel via Runner Up Records.

In 2011, By Surprise released their debut full-length album Mountain Smashers via Topshelf Records.

On January 12, 2013, By Surprise released another EP titled Criteria via Topshelf Records.

In 2015, Suburbia Records released a box split featuring a split between By Surprise and Broadcaster.

Band members
Patrick R. Gartland - Guitar, Vocals
Daniel J. Saraceni - Bass, Vocals
Robert J. Wilcox - Guitar, Vocals
Devin P. Carr - Drums

Discography
Studio albums
Mountain Smashers (2011, Topshelf Records)
EPs
By Surprise (2006, CD-R Self-Released)
478 (2008, CD-R Self-Released)
478 (Vinyl Reissue - 2012, Kat Kat Records)
Criteria (2013, Topshelf Records)
Splits
By Surprise/Hightide Hotel (2009, Runner Up Records)
By Surprise/Broadcaster (2015, Suburbia Records)
Aspiga/By Surprise (2016, Asian Man Records)
Cassettes
2006-2009 Discography (2009, Self-Released)

References

Musical groups from New Jersey
Musical groups established in 2007
People from Haddon Heights, New Jersey
Topshelf Records artists